DCM (also known as DCM Ventures) is a venture capital firm located in Silicon Valley, Tokyo and Beijing. It has approximately $4.2 billion under management. DCM was the first Silicon Valley firm to invest in the early-stage technology sector in China, beginning in 1999. Since 2019, DCM has had seven initial public offerings, which include Bill.com (NYSE: BILL), BlueCity (NASDAQ: BLCT), Freee (TYO: 4478), Life360 (ASX: 360), Sansan (TYO: 4443), UCloud (SHA: 688158), and VisasQ (TYO: 4490). DCM has over $200 billion in enterprise value.

History
DCM (formerly Doll Capital Management) was co-founded in 1996 as an investment firm targeting early-stage companies by David Chao and Dixon Doll. It now has operations in Silicon Valley, Tokyo and Beijing. The company has mostly invested in start-ups in the U.S., China, Japan and South Korea but does have additional investments in Europe, the Middle East and Latin America.

DCM general partners include David Chao and Jason Krikorian in the U.S.; Hurst Lin and Ramon Zeng in China; and Osuke Honda in Japan. Kyle Lui is an additional investment partner in the U.S.

Funds
In 2021, Business Insider revealed that DCM's 2014 flagship fund is set to generate $10 billion and a 30x return multiple, making it one of the top performing venture funds in recent history.

In 2020, DCM raised $880 million for its global family of investment funds.  The committed capital includes $780 million for DCM IX, its largest global fund to date, and $100 million for its third A-fund dedicated to global seed-stage investments. Since its last fund, DCM has had 17 liquidity events, including Careem (acquired by Uber), Pony.ai, Wrike and Musical.ly (now TikTok). 

In 2016,  DCM raised $770 million for its investment funds. The firm runs a flagship fund for early-stage companies, a growth-stage investment fund (its Turbo Fund), and the A-Fund, an Android-focused VC fund that targets mobile and emerging platforms from early stage companies. In total, it has about $3.5 billion under management. Between 2013 and 2016, DCM returned $1.5 billion to its investors in profit upon exits from various investments previously under management.

Investments 

 51Job
 58.com
 Bill.com
 BlueCity (also known as Blued)
 BitAuto
 Brigit
 Careem (acquired by Uber) 
 Dangdang
 DocSend (acquired by Dropbox)
 DXY
 Eaze
 Figure
 Folio
 Fortinet
 Freee
 Happy Elements
 hims & hers
 Houchebang (formerly ManBang)
 Kakao Talk
 Kuaishou
 Lime
 Maimai
 Matterport
 Musical.ly (now TikTok)
 Origin
 Peco
 Plenty
 Pony.ai
 Sansan
 Shift
 SigFig
 Sling Media
 SoFi
 TanTan
 Tempo (formerly Pivot)
 Tuniu
 UCloud
 UJET
 Uxin
 Vipshop
 Wrike

References

Venture capital firms of China
1996 establishments in California
1996 establishments in Japan
1996 establishments in China